SUNY Broome Community College (BCC or SUNY Broome) is a public community college in Broome County, New York. It is part of the State University of New York (SUNY). The college was founded in 1946 and has gone through several name changes. The school is located in the Town of Dickinson, just north of the City of Binghamton, New York. The college had a 2010 enrollment of over 6,000 students and has alumni of over 41,000.

SUNY Broome serves students from a single campus on Upper Front Street in Dickinson, New York, though some classes are taught in Waverly, Owego, and within the City of Binghamton at smaller classroom centers. The campus' fifteen buildings comprise  of space and feature recently upgraded athletic facilities such as baseball fields, soccer and lacrosse field, publicly accessible tennis courts, the Dick Baldwin Gym, named after the third winningest college basketball coach across both two- and four-year colleges, and a new ice rink. There is also a theater which hosts campus performances of plays and other theatrical work, titled The Little Theater.

Timeline
 1946. Established as New York State Institute of Applied Arts & Sciences at Binghamton (with "New York State" sometimes abbreviated "NYS")
 1953. Became Broome County Technical Institute
 1956. Became Broome Technical Community College
 1957. Moved to new campus on Upper Front Street (NY Route 11)
 1971. Name changed to Broome Community College
 2013. Name changed to SUNY Broome

Athletics
The SUNY Broome Hornets participate in the NJCAA as a member of Region III.
Broome fields fifteen varsity sports:
men's baseball,
men's basketball,
men's cross country,
men's golf,
men's ice hockey,
men's lacrosse,
men's soccer,
men's tennis,
women's basketball,
women's cross country,
women's lacrosse,
women's soccer,
women's softball,
women's tennis, and
women's volleyball.

The women's soccer team won the national championship in 2007, 2008, and 2016.

References

External links 

 
Two-year colleges in the United States
SUNY community colleges
Educational institutions established in 1946
Education in Broome County, New York
1946 establishments in New York (state)
NJCAA athletics